Tunisien (T23, F706), was a  in service with the Free French Naval Forces and the French Navy from 1944 to 1964. She was scrapped in 1964.

History

World War II
The ship was originally built as USS Crosley (DE-108), an American named for Rear Admiral Walter Selywn Crosley. Crosley was transferred to the Free French Naval Forces under lend lease on 12 February 1944, and renamed Tunisien (T23).

Tunisien participated in Operation Anvil-Dragoon on 15 August 1944.

Ownership of the vessel was transferred to France on 21 April 1952 under the Mutual Defense Assistance Program.

Algerian War
Tunisien participated in the Algerian War in 1956. She was decommissioned and returned to the U.S. Navy in 1964 and scrapped.

See also
 List of escorteurs of the French Navy

References

External links

 

Cannon-class destroyer escorts of the United States Navy
Ships built in Wilmington, Delaware
1943 ships
Cannon-class destroyer escorts of the Free French Naval Forces
World War II frigates of France
Cold War frigates of France
Cannon-class destroyer escorts of the French Navy
Ships built by Dravo Corporation